Magalie Finot-Laivier (born 20 January 1973) is a road cyclist from France. She represented her nation at the 2005 UCI Road World Championships.

References

External links
 profile at Procyclingstats.com

1973 births
French female cyclists
Living people
Place of birth missing (living people)
People from Nevers
Sportspeople from Nièvre
20th-century French women
21st-century French women
Cyclists from Bourgogne-Franche-Comté